Li Shuai may refer to:
Li Shuai (footballer, born 1982), Chinese footballer goalkeeper from Qingdao, who plays for Shanghai Shenhua
Li Shuai (footballer, born 1994), Chinese footballer from Guiyang, who plays for Heilongjiang Lava Spring
Li Shuai (footballer, born 1995), Chinese footballer from Shenyang, who plays for Dalian Yifang